Florent Stevance (born 8 October 1988) is a French professional footballer who plays as a striker for US Maubeuge.

Career
In summer 2015, Stevance joined Charleroi on a two-year contract with the option of a further two years.

In January 2019, after six month with Tours, he signed a -year contract with Seraing.

References

External links
 
 Florent Stevance Interview

1988 births
Living people
French footballers
Association football forwards
R. Charleroi S.C. players
K.S.V. Roeselare players
A.F.C. Tubize players
Tours FC players
R.F.C. Seraing (1922) players
Championnat National players
Championnat National 3 players
Belgian Pro League players
Challenger Pro League players
French expatriate footballers
French expatriate sportspeople in Belgium
Expatriate footballers in Belgium